Caudus or Kaudos was the principal town of Gavdos off ancient Crete. The execution of Sotades by Patroclus, according to some interpretations, took place at or near the town.

Suda writes that it was famous for the big onagers.

Its site is tentatively located near modern Ag. Ioannis.

References

Populated places in ancient Crete
Former populated places in Greece